Evan Mawdsley (born 1945) is a British historian and former Professor of International History at the University of Glasgow's School of Humanities. He is currently a Professorial Research Fellow. He specializes in Russian history and the history of World War II.

Bibliography
 The Russian Revolution and the Baltic Fleet. War and Politics, February 1917—April 1918 (Macmillan, 1978)
 The Russian Civil War (Allen & Unwin, 1987)
 Blue Guide to Moscow and Leningrad (W. W. Norton, 1991)
 The Stalin Years: The Soviet Union, 1929–1953 (Manchester University Press, 1998)
 The Soviet Elite from Lenin to Gorbachev: The Central Committee and Its Members, 1917-1991 (Oxford University Press, 2000), with Stephen White
 Thunder in the East: The Nazi-Soviet War, 1941-1945 (Bloomsbury, 2005) (second edition 2016)
 World War II: A New History (Cambridge University Press, 2009)
 December 1941: Twelve Days That Began a World War (Yale University Press, 2011)
 Cambridge History of the Second World War (3 vols, Cambridge University Press, 2015) (General Editor)
 The War for the Seas: A Maritime History of World War II'' (Yale University Press, 2019)

Citations

External links
 "Evan Mawdsley" at IMDb

1945 births
Living people
Academics of the University of Glasgow
20th-century British historians
Historians of Russia
21st-century British historians